WKLC-FM (105.1 MHz, "Rock 105") is a mainstream rock formatted broadcast radio station licensed to St. Albans, West Virginia, serving the Charleston/Huntington area.  WKLC-FM is owned and operated by L.M. Communications, Inc.

References

External links
Rock 105 Online

1966 establishments in West Virginia
Mainstream rock radio stations in the United States
Radio stations established in 1966
KLC-FM